Charles Vere Wintour  (18 May 1917 – 4 November 1999) was a British newspaper editor, the father of Vogue magazine editor-in-chief, Anna Wintour, and of the diplomatic editor of The Guardian newspaper, Patrick Wintour. After a life in media and publishing, Charles Wintour went on to become the editor-in-chief of the London Evening Standard.

Under his leadership, the Evening Standard was described as a "blend of popular and serious news and opinion" which prefigured many of the broadsheets of the 21st century". Wintour was educated at the University of Cambridge where he edited Granta magazine.

Early life

Wintour was born in Pamphill Manor, near Wimborne, Dorset, the son of Alice Jane Blanche Foster and Major-General Fitzgerald Wintour. He was the brother of Cordelia Mary Wintour. He wrote articles for the Radio Times while he was at Oundle School, and won a prize awarded by the Daily Mail.  He then went up to university where he studied at Peterhouse, Cambridge, reading English and history and briefly editing the Granta magazine with Eric Hobsbawm.

Career
After Cambridge, Wintour took a London job in advertising, but left at the start of World War II to join the Royal Norfolk Regiment. During the war, he was awarded the military MBE, the Croix de Guerre and the Bronze Star.

In 1946, Wintour became a leader writer for the London Evening Standard. He was soon promoted to political editor, then moved to the Sunday Express as assistant editor. He returned to the Standard as deputy editor, during which period he convinced Lord Beaverbrook to launch the Evening Standard Awards for theatre in 1955. Wintour became managing editor of the Daily Express in 1958, then in 1959 moved back to the Standard as editor.

Although circulation fell somewhat under Wintour's editorship, he was well-regarded, and was considered for the post of editor of The Times in 1967. He was particularly passionate about the paper's politics and high-society gossip column, the Londoner's Diary, once remarking that: "To go to a decent London dinner party without having read the Diary would be to go out unprepared for proper conversation."

Wintour remained editor until 1976, when he became managing director of the Daily Express, supervising its transition from broadsheet to tabloid. He took part in the negotiations to merge the London Evening Standard with the Evening News, championing the case for keeping the staff and approach of the Standard. As a result, the proposed merger was called off. The Express Group was sold to Trafalgar House, and new owner Victor Matthews appointed Wintour editor of the Standard again in 1978. In 1979, Wintour joined the Press Council, serving for two years. In 1980, the Standard and the News were finally merged. While the name of the Standard was ultimately retained, Wintour and his senior executives were replaced by former News editor Louis Kirby and his respective executives.

In 1981, Wintour launched the Sunday Express Magazine with new wife Audrey Slaughter, and in 1984 they launched Working Woman magazine. In 1985, Wintour became editor of the Press Gazette, and he advised on the launch of Today, The Independent and the new Daily News, in addition to the breakfast television show TV-am.

He wrote two key books drawn from experience: Pressures on the Press in 1972, a candid account of decision-making during every hour of the newspaper day; and The Rise and Fall of Fleet Street in 1989, a shrewd analysis of Fleet Street as a publishing centre through those who were responsible for its historic rise and the more recent responses to new technology.

Wintour retired in 1989 and spent his later years supporting the Liberal Democrats and chairing the regional National Art Collections Fund.

Death
Wintour died in London, U.K. on November 4, 1999. He was 82.

Influence
Wintour's impact on London theatre has been acknowledged by both major organisers of annual drama awards. When he retired in 1982, the Society of London Theatre paid tribute by giving him the Society of London Theatre Special Award, which would usually go to actors, directors and such. After death, his own Evening Standard Theatre Awards added his name into one category, to create The Charles Wintour Award for Most Promising Playwright. Most significant of all, at his memorial wake, supervised in 1999 by his daughter Anna, the leading playwright Harold Pinter read from his own work and expressed gratitude for his play The Caretaker winning the Best Play award in 1960, which saw his career lift off.

Personal life
In 1940 Wintour married Eleanor "Nonie" Trego Baker; the couple later divorced in 1979. A year later, he married Audrey Slaughter with whom he was involved in magazine publishing.

He had five children, of whom two, Anna and Patrick, later became prominent journalists.

References

Alumni of Peterhouse, Cambridge
Recipients of the Croix de Guerre 1939–1945 (France)
English newspaper editors
English male journalists
British Army personnel of World War II
Commanders of the Order of the British Empire
People educated at Oundle School
Royal Norfolk Regiment officers
1917 births
1999 deaths
London Evening Standard people
Charles